Rajiv Raj Kapoor (25 August 1962  9 February 2021) was an Indian actor, film producer, film director and a member of the Kapoor family, best known for his lead role in Ram Teri Ganga Maili. He was the youngest son of Raj Kapoor, the legendary Bollywood actor-director-producer.

His elder brothers Randhir Kapoor and late Rishi Kapoor were also successful Bollywood actors. Famous actors Shammi Kapoor and Shashi Kapoor were his uncles. Prithviraj Kapoor was his paternal grandfather and Trilok Kapoor was his paternal great-uncle.

Career 
Kapoor made his debut in Ek Jaan Hain Hum in 1983. He played the leading role in his father Raj Kapoor's last directorial venture Ram Teri Ganga Maili in 1985. He acted in several other films with the most notable being Aasmaan (1984), Lover Boy (1985), Zabardast (1985) and Hum To Chale Pardes (1988). He made his penultimate film appearance in Zimmedaaar in 1990 after which he turned to producing and directing. Kapoor also acted in the film Aag Ka Darya with legendary actors Dilip Kumar and Rekha which was shot and completed but remains unreleased.

After his father's death, he assumed the role of producer for the popular film Henna in 1991, which was directed by his elder brother Randhir Kapoor. Further, in 1996 he made his directorial debut with the commercially unsuccessful Prem Granth, which starred his brother Rishi Kapoor and Madhuri Dixit. In 1999, he was one of the producers of Aa Ab Laut Chalen which was directed by his brother Rishi Kapoor. Since then he was not active in film producing or directing.

He was set to make a comeback to acting after 30 years, appearing in the film Toolsidas Junior which had completed filming shortly before his death. It was released on May 21, 2022.

Personal life 
In 2001, he married architect Aarti Sabharwal, working paralegal at a Law firm in Vaughan. They divorced in 2003.

Death 
Kapoor was staying at his brother Randhir's place when he had a heart attack during the early hours of 9 February 2021. His elder brother Randhir Kapoor rushed him to Inlaks Hospital but he was declared dead on arrival by the doctors. He was 58 years old. His last film Toolsidas Junior, produced by Ashutosh Gowariker, was posthumously released on May 21, 2022.

Filmography
Actor:
 Ek Jaan Hain Hum (1983) ... Vikram Saxena
 Aasmaan (1984) ... Kumar / Chandan Singh (Double Role)
 Mera Saathi (1985) ... Shyam
 Lava (1985) ... Amar
 Zabardast (1985) ... Ravi Kumar / Tony
 Ram Teri Ganga Maili (1985) ... Narendra Sahai "Naren"
 Lover Boy  (1985) ... Kishan / Kanhaiya (Double Role)
 Preeti (1986)
 Zalzala  (1988) ... Bhole
 Hum To Chale Pardes (1988) ... Ajay Mehra
 Shukriyaa (1988) ... Ajay Singh
 Naag Nagin (1989) ... Kuber / Suraj
 Zimmedaaar (1990) ... Inspector Rajiv Singh
 Toolsidas Junior (2022)..... Toolsidas 

Producer:
 Henna (1991) (Executive Producer)
 Prem Granth (1996) (Executive Producer)
 Aa Ab Laut Chalen (1999) (Producer)

Editor:
 Aa Ab Laut Chalen (1999)
 Prem Granth (1996)

Second Unit Director or Assistant Director:
 Prem Rog (1982)
 Biwi-O-Biwi (1981)

Director:
 Prem Granth (1996)

Self:
 Raj Kapoor  (1987)... Himself

References

External links

 
 

1962 births
2021 deaths
20th-century Indian film directors
20th-century Indian male actors
Film directors from Mumbai
Film producers from Mumbai
Hindi-language film directors
Indian male film actors
Rajiv
Male actors in Hindi cinema
Punjabi people